Savannah is a city and county seat of Andrew County, Missouri, United States.  The population was 5,069 at the 2020 census.

History
Savannah was founded in 1841. The city was named after Savannah Woods, the child of a first settler. A post office called Savannah has been in operation since 1841.

The Andrew County Courthouse was listed on the National Register of Historic Places in 1980.

Geography
Savannah is located on Business 71 ten miles north of St Joseph. The One Hundred and Two River flows past two miles east of the city and the Happy Hollar Lake Conservation Area is three miles to the northeast.

Demographics

Savannah is part of the St. Joseph, MO–KS Metropolitan Statistical Area.

2010 census
As of the census of 2010, there were 5,057 people, 2,043 households, and 1,327 families living in the city. The racial makeup of the city was 97.7% White, 0.4% African American, 0.3% Native American, 0.5% Asian, 0.3% from other races, and 0.8% from two or more races. Hispanic or Latino of any race were 1.6% of the population.

There were 2,043 households, of which 34.2% had children under the age of 18 living with them, 47.3% were married couples living together, 12.5% had a female householder with no husband present, 5.1% had a male householder with no wife present, and 35.0% were non-families. 30.4% of all households were made up of individuals, and 17% had someone living alone who was 65 years of age or older. The average household size was 2.41 and the average family size was 2.99.

The median age in the city was 38 years. 25.7% of residents were under the age of 18; 8.5% were between the ages of 18 and 24; 23.8% were from 25 to 44; 22.8% were from 45 to 64; and 19.1% were 65 years of age or older. The gender makeup of the city was 45.4% male and 54.6% female.

2000 census
As of the census of 2000, there were 4,763 people, 1,927 households, and 1,266 families living in the city. The population density was 1,523.2 people per square mile (587.4/km). There were 2,038 housing units at an average density of 651.9 per square mile (251.4/km). The racial makeup of the city was 98.38% White, 0.29% African American, 0.38% Native American, 0.21% Asian, 0.25% from other races, and 0.48% from two or more races. Hispanic or Latino of any race were 0.59% of the population.

There were 1,927 households, out of which 32.1% had children under the age of 18 living with them, 51.8% were married couples living together, 10.9% had a female householder with no husband present, and 34.3% were non-families. 30.9% of all households were made up of individuals, and 17.5% had someone living alone who was 65 years of age or older. The average household size was 2.38 and the average family size was 2.99.

In the city, the population was spread out, with 25.5% under the age of 18, 8.6% from 18 to 24, 26.0% from 25 to 44, 19.4% from 45 to 64, and 20.6% who were 65 years of age or older. The median age was 38 years. For every 100 females, there were 81.7 males. For every 100 females age 18 and over, there were 77.2 males.

The median income for a household in the city was $32,996, and the median income for a family was $40,615. Males had a median income of $31,450 versus $20,851 for females. The per capita income for the city was $17,809. About 10.2% of families and 11.8% of the population were below the poverty line, including 17.6% of those under age 18 and 8.9% of those age 65 or over.

Education
Public education in Savannah is administered by Savannah R-III School District.

Savannah has a public library, the Savannah Branch library.

Notable people
 John Peter Altgeld – Governor of Illinois who lived in Savannah between 1869 and 1875
 Joseph Baldwin – "father of the Normal school"
 Charles Bruffy – Grammy Award winner
 Owen Bush – actor
 Harry Duncan – founded Little Tavern Shops
 Andrew J. Harlan – U.S. Representative from Indiana
 Elmer Holt – tenth Governor of Montana
 Joseph Toole – first and fourth Governor of Montana
 Carrie Stevens Walter – educator
 Eminem – rap artist (lived in public housing in the community)

References

External links
 City of Savannah
 Historic maps of Savannah in the Sanborn Maps of Missouri Collection at the University of Missouri

Cities in Andrew County, Missouri
County seats in Missouri
St. Joseph, Missouri metropolitan area
Populated places established in 1841
1841 establishments in Missouri
Cities in Missouri